The 1952–53 season was the 54th completed season of The Football League.

Final league tables

The tables below are reproduced here in the exact form that they can be found at The Rec.Sport.Soccer Statistics Foundation website and in Rothmans Book of Football League Records 1888–89 to 1978–79, with home and away statistics separated.

Beginning with the season 1894–95, clubs finishing level on points were separated according to goal average (goals scored divided by goals conceded), or more properly put, goal ratio. In case one or more teams had the same goal difference, this system favoured those teams who had scored fewer goals. The goal average system was eventually scrapped beginning with the 1976–77 season.

From the 1922–23 season, the bottom two teams of both Third Division North and Third Division South were required to apply for re-election.

First Division

Arsenal won their second league title of the postwar era, finishing ahead of runners-up Preston North End on goal average - denying them a first league title since they won the first two English Football League titles more than 60 years earlier. Wolverhampton Wanderers bounced back after two disappointing seasons to finish third, three points short of the title. They finished one point ahead of their local rivals West Bromwich Albion. Defending champions Manchester United, in a period of transition as the team captained by Johnny Carey started to make way for a younger generation of players, finished eighth. 

Stoke City and Derby County, who had been among the First Division's leading lights in the first few postwar seasons, went down to the Second Division after several seasons of gradually declining form. Liverpool, the 1947 champions, avoided the drop by just two points.

Results

Maps

Second Division

Results

Maps

Third Division North

Results

Maps

Third Division South

Results

Maps

See also
1952-53 in English football

References

Ian Laschke: Rothmans Book of Football League Records 1888–89 to 1978–79. Macdonald and Jane’s, London & Sydney, 1980.

English Football League seasons
Eng
1952–53 in English football leagues